The Center of the Universe Festival was an annual music festival held in Downtown Tulsa, Oklahoma. The main stage was located at an outdoor stage outside Cain's Ballroom on Main Street, and secondary venues were located throughout the Brady Arts District. Art galleries in the area offered free admission during the event.

History
In 2013, the festival's first year, the headliners included Tulsa's own Ryan Tedder with OneRepublic, Neon Trees, OK GO, MUTEMATH, What Made Milwaukee Famous, Bronze Radio Return, and Mayer Hawthorne. The festival was from July 19–20 and was presented by the Hard Rock Hotel and Casino Tulsa. Over 80,000 people came out for the festival, 91% of whom were from Oklahoma. Other acts at the festival included Quiet Company, Stardeath and White Dwarfs, Colourmusic, Plaid Dragon, Alan Doyle, Wheeler Brothers, Taddy Porter, Eric Himan, Center Of The Universe, A Lion Named Roar, Horse Thief, Jumpship Astronaut, Paul Benjaman Band, The Mowglis, The Last Slice, FM Pilots, Fiawna Forte, We The Ghost, Kawnar, All About A Bubble, Aftermidnight, Steve Liddell, The Cultivation, Jason Ferguson, Jake Wesley Rogers, Larry G, and Allie Lauren.

The 2014 festival was held July 25–26, with headliners Twenty One Pilots, Fitz and the Tantrums and AWOLNATION on Friday night and Cold War Kids, Capital Cities and Young the Giant on Saturday night.

References

External links
Center of the Universe Festival Site

Music festivals in Oklahoma
Culture of Tulsa, Oklahoma